Diocese of Leeds may refer to:

Anglican Diocese of Leeds
Roman Catholic Diocese of Leeds